Daniel Malan (born 14 December 1948) is a South African cricketer. He played in one List A and four first-class matches for Boland in 1980/81 and 1981/82.

See also
 List of Boland representative cricketers

References

External links
 

1948 births
Living people
South African cricketers
Boland cricketers
Cricketers from Paarl